Federal elections were held in Germany on 28 October 1884. The Centre Party remained the largest party in the Reichstag, with 99 of the 397 seats. Voter turnout was 60.5%.

Results

Alsace-Lorraine

References

Federal elections in Germany
Germany
1884 elections in Germany
Elections in the German Empire
October 1884 events